Mikhail Ivanov may refer to:

 Mikhail Ivanov (composer) (1849–1927), Russian composer
 Mikhail Ivanov (cross-country skier) (born 1977), Russian cross country skier
 Mikhail Ivanov (rower) (born 1965), Russian rower
 Mikhail Ivanov (sledge hockey) (born 1983), Russian sledge hockey player
 Mikhail Ivanov (water polo) (born 1958), Russian former water polo player
 Mikhail Ivanov (chess player) (born 1963), Serbian-Russian chess grandmaster

See also
 Mikhail Ippolitov-Ivanov (1859–1935), Russian composer
 Mikhail Matveevich Ivanov (1748-1823), Russian painter